Julien Cools (born 13 February 1947) is a Belgian former footballer who won the Belgian Golden Shoe in 1977 while at Club Brugge. He was discovered as a junior at SK Retie Branddonk of Antwerp and made his name with Berchem Sport, before signing for Beringen FC. He was signed by FC Bruges in 1973 where his reputation for non-stop runner in the midfield made him an international regular. Cools helped FC Bruges to win the Belgian league titles in 1975–76, 76–77 and 77–78 plus the Belgian Cup in 1977. In Europe, Cools was a runner-up in the 1976 U.E.F.A.Cup Final and 1978 European Cup Final, Bruges losing both finals to Liverpool. He was rated by World Soccer Magazine as Bruges' best player in that 1978 Final.
At 32 Cools left Bruges to join Beerschot where he enjoyed a new lease of life, becoming Captain of the national team. At the 1980 European Championship in Italy Cools played in all four of Belgium's games including the Final where they lost to West Germany. He was capped 35 times and scored two goals for the Belgium national team.

In April 2008, he accepted an offer to become the Assistant coach of the Brunei national football team.

Honours

Player 
Club Brugge

 Belgian First Division A: 1975–76, 1976–77, 1977–78
 Belgian Cup: 1976–77 (winners), 1978-79 (runners-up)
 UEFA Cup: 1975-1976 (runners-up)
 European Champion Clubs' Cup: 1977–78 (runners-up)

International 
Belgium

 UEFA European Championship: 1980 (runners-up)
 Belgian Sports Merit Award: 1980

Individual 

 Belgian Golden Shoe: 1977

References

1947 births
Living people
Belgian footballers
Belgium international footballers
Club Brugge KV players
UEFA Euro 1980 players
K.F.C. Dessel Sport players
K. Beringen F.C. players
K. Beerschot V.A.C. players
K.V.C. Westerlo players
People from Retie
Association football midfielders
Footballers from Antwerp Province